Faucon Flacq Sports Club is a Mauritian football club based in Centre de Flacq, Flacq District. In 2017, they play in the Mauritian Regional League.

Ground
Their home stadium is Stade Auguste Vollaire, located in Centre de Flacq, Flacq.

Achievements
Mauritian League: 5
1949, 1954, 1955, 1957, 1958

Mauritian Cup: 2
1959, 1967

Mauritian Republic Cup: 1
2003

Performance in CAF competitions
CAF Champions League: 1 appearance
1997 – First Round

See also
 Mauritius Football Association
 List of football clubs in Mauritius

References

Football clubs in Mauritius
Flacq District
1945 establishments in Mauritius